Piaranthus is a succulent plant genus in the subfamily Asclepiadoideae, in the family Apocynaceae.

It was first described in 1810. Its name comes from Greek and is descriptive of the fleshy, succulent flowers typical of the genus ("piar-" = fat, "-anthos" = flower).

Description

The plants typically form flat, spreading mats of multiple offsetting stems. The stems are small, compact and four-edged. Tubercles (leaf remnants) appear along the four sides.

The flowers are small, fleshy, and bear five independent petals in a star shape. They appear in clusters, each flower up-turned, on a tiny inflorescence that sprouts from the tip of the stem. Each stem usually only produces a maximum of one inflorescence. The flowers of different species are in a range of colours; most emit unpleasant odours, especially the darker red or brown coloured ones.

The compact, mat-forming stems are very similar to those of the related genus Duvalia, and the two are often confused when not in flower. However the stems of Piaranthus have four sides (in cross-section), while those of Duvalia often have more.

Distribution
The genus Piaranthus is restricted to the western part of Southern Africa. It occurs in arid, sandy areas, in the shade of bushes.

Species

formerly included
species transferred to other genera (Caralluma, Hoodia, Huerniopsis, Quaqua, Stisseria)

Taxonomy
Phylogenetic studies have shown the genus to be monophyletic, and to be very closely related to the genera Orbea and Stapelia. More distantly related are the genera Huernia and Tavaresia.

References

Asclepiadoideae
Apocynaceae genera